The Government College of Education is an premier educational institution for teacher education of North India.  It is located in sector 20 of Chandigarh, Punjab, India.

Government College of Education, previously known as Government Post-Graduate Basic Training College, was founded in August 1954 under a special scheme of Government of India in the Second Five-Year Plan for establishment of training colleges for teachers at the post-graduate level. College is the single Teacher Education college functioning under the Government sector affiliated with the Panjab University Chandigarh.The National Assessment and Accreditation Council (NAAC) has accredited twice Grade ‘A’ to this College. The National Council for Teacher Education has sanctioned 50 seats for M.Ed. (General), 100 seats for B.Ed.(General). College is also running add-on course of Post Graduate Diploma in Guidance and Counselling (PGDG&C). College is having highly talented faculty selected on All India basis by the Union Public Service Commission (UPSC), New Delhi for ensuring high quality standards for improving the quality of teacher education in the country. College follows the curriculum formulated as per the direction of National Council of Teacher Education and formulated by Panjab University, Chandigarh.

It has been affiliated with Punjab University, Chandigarh since 1981.

See also 
Education in India
Literacy in India
List of institutions of higher education in Punjab, India
 List of teacher education schools in India

References

External links
Official site

Colleges of education in India
Universities and colleges in Chandigarh
Panjab University
Educational institutions established in 1954
1954 establishments in East Punjab